The Elijah P. Lovejoy Monument, also known as the Elijah Lovejoy Monument, Elijah Parrish Lovejoy Shaft, Lovejoy Monument, and Lovejoy State Memorial, is a memorial in Alton, Illinois to Elijah P. Lovejoy, an advocate of free speech and the abolition of slavery. 

Lovejoy had moved his press across the Mississippi River to Alton after his offices were attacked three times by pro-slavery forces at his former location in St. Louis, Missouri. He hid the press in a warehouse before setting up his new operation but was attacked again on November 7, 1837. He was fatally shot that night when the building was attacked and destroyed by a pro-slavery mob.

History

Elijah P. Lovejoy (1802-1837) was an abolitionist in the 1830s, running a newspaper called the St Louis Observer, in Missouri, a slave state. Slavery advocates attacked and destroyed his presses three times. He decided to move across the river to Alton, Illinois, in 1837, where he renamed his newspaper as the Alton Observer. 

Although Illinois was a free state, there were numerous people in the area who supported slavery. Southern Illinois was settled by many slaveowners from the South. On November 7, 1837, a crowd attacked the warehouse owned by Winthrop Sargent Gilman, an abolitionist who had groceries in St. Louis and aided Lovejoy in acquiring his fourth press. 

Lovejoy and some supporters were in the warehouse where the presses were stored. As the building was stormed, the attackers apparently began firing guns. Lovejoy and his men returned fire, but in the conflict Lovejoy was killed.

His death garnered national attention. He was considered a martyr in the causes of both freedom of speech and the abolition of slavery. 

In 1857, Abraham Lincoln wrote to a friend about this event:
Lovejoy's tragic death for freedom in every sense marked his sad ending as the most important single event that ever happened in the new world.
"- Abraham Lincoln, 1857 letter to friend Lemen"The following year, Lincoln gave his House Divided speech in June 1858 during his campaign for the US Senate seat representing Illinois.

Having been buried in an unmarked grave in Alton, Lovejoy's remains became lost for some time. Dimmock led an effort to find them, discovering the site was partially covered by a roadway. Lovejoy's remains were exhumed and reinterred in the cemetery that is now overlooked by his monument. Dimmock arranged for installation of a gravestone here.

In the 1890s, work began in earnest on the monument. It was designed by R. P. Bringhurst, a St. Louis sculptor, and built by Culver Stone Company of Springfield, Illinois.

Structure

The monument consists of a 93-foot-tall main shaft topped by a 17-foot-tall winged statue of victory. Located on a bluff, the complete work stands more than 300 feet above the Mississippi river below. It has two side spires mounted by eagles, as well as two bronze lion chalice statues. A stone whispering wall bench wraps around the central spire. Visitors can hear someone whispering who is completely out of sight on the opposite side.

Located on top of the river bluff, the monument is easily seen from a distance. Travelers over the bridge from Missouri into Illinois can see it from a considerable distance away.

The four sides of the central spire's pedestal contain quotes by Lovejoy. These give examples of major aspects of his life:

Champion of Free Speech.
But, gentlemen, as long as I am an American citizen, and as long as American blood runs in these veins, I shall hold myself at liberty to speak, to write, to publish whatever I please on any subject--being amenable to the laws of my country for the same.

Salve, Victores!
This monument commemorates the valor, devotion and sacrifice of the noble Defenders of the Press, who, in this city, on Nov. 7, 1837, made the first armed resistance to the aggressions of the slave power in America.

Minister of the Gospel. Moderator of Alton Presbytery,
If the laws of my country fail to protect me I appeal to God, and with him I cheerfully rest my cause. I can die at my post but I cannot desert it.

Elijah P. Lovejoy, Editor Alton Observer,
Albion, Maine, Nov. 8, 1802
Alton, Ill., Nov. 7, 1837.

A Martyr to Liberty.
I have sworn eternal opposition to slavery, and by the blessing of God, I will never go back.

Gallery

References

Abolitionism in the United States
Monuments and memorials in Illinois
1897 sculptures
Sculptures of lions
Sculptures of birds in the United States
Bronze sculptures in Illinois
Statues in Illinois
Outdoor sculptures in Illinois
Monuments and memorials to victims of slavery in the United States
1897 establishments in Illinois
Illinois State Historic Sites
Alton, Illinois